Akkara (Telugu: అక్కర) may refer to
Anil Akkara (born 1972), Indian politician
Nigel Akkara, Bengali actor
Akkara Kazhchakal, a 2008–2010 Malayalam sitcom
Akkara Paha, a 1969 Sri Lankan drama film